The Bank of England £5 note, also known as a fiver, is a sterling banknote . It is the smallest denomination of banknote currently issued by the Bank of England. In September 2016, a new polymer note was introduced, featuring the image of Queen Elizabeth II on the obverse and a portrait of Winston Churchill on the reverse. The old paper note, first issued in 2002 and bearing the image of prison reformer Elizabeth Fry on the reverse, was phased out and ceased to be legal tender after 5 May 2017.

History

Introduction 
Five pound notes (£5) were introduced by the Bank of England in 1793, following the ten pound note, which had been introduced in 1759 as a consequence of gold shortages caused by the Seven Years' War. The 5 pound note was introduced again, due to gold shortages caused by the French Revolutionary Wars and the Napoleonic Wars and was the lowest denomination of note issued until 1797. The earliest notes were handwritten and were issued to individuals as needed. These notes were written on one side only and bore the name of the payee, the date and the signature of the issuing cashier.

Restriction period 
In 1797, due to the extra money need to fund the war and the uncertainty caused as Britain declared war on France, a series of bank runs drained the Bank of England of its gold supply. The Bank was forced to stop exchanging gold for notes and to issue notes of £1 and £2 denominations. This was known as the 'restriction period', as the exchange of notes for their value in gold was restricted.

The Restriction Period ended in 1821 as the Government had to anchor the value of the currency to gold in order to control sharply rising inflation and national debt. After a brief period to offset any sudden deflation, the UK returned to the gold standard on 1 May 1821. These notes could again be exchanged in full, or in part, for an equivalent amount of gold when presented at the bank. If redeemed in part, the banknote would be marked to indicate the amount that had been redeemed. From 1853 printed notes replaced handwritten notes, with the declaration "I promise to pay the bearer on demand the sum of five pounds" replacing the name of the payee. This declaration remains on Bank of England banknotes to this day. A printed signature of one of three cashiers appeared on the printed notes, though this was replaced by the signature of the Chief Cashier from 1870 onward.

Move away from gold standard 

The right to redeem banknotes for gold ceased in 1931, when Britain stopped using the gold standard. Metal thread was introduced on the £5 note in 1945 as a security feature. The printed black and white notes were replaced from 1957 onward by new, two-sided notes. The first two-sided £5 notes (series B) were blue and featured a bust of Britannia on the front and a lion on the back. Series C notes, first introduced in 1963, were the first notes to feature an image of the monarch on the front, with Britannia being relegated to the back. From 1971 onward, with the introduction of series D, a British historical figure was portrayed on the reverse: the soldier and statesman the Duke of Wellington in this case. Series E notes, first issued in 1990, are multicoloured, although they are predominantly turquoise-blue. These notes feature a portrait of railway pioneer George Stephenson, as well as for the first time 'windowed' metal thread; this thread appears as a dashed line, yet forms a single line when held up to the light.

2002 Varnish Issue 
In 2002, a problem was identified in which the serial numbers could be rubbed off of some notes.  The problem was highlighted after six members of the public complained to The Bank of England; banks as well as Post Offices stopped distributing the notes at the request of the Bank of England to stop issuing the new £5 notes. The Bank said the move was a "precautionary measure while we carry out further tests and investigative work into what might have caused the fault and how widespread the problem is". The bank consequently did rigorous testing and found the problem to be that the serial numbers were printed over the varnish rather than under it allowing the ink to be removed if enough force was applied. The Bank started to varnish the notes in an attempt to make them last longer than previous notes which only had an estimated lifespan of nine months.

A spokesman for the Bank of England said: "The notes are still legal tender and the public shouldn't have a problem spending them in the shops. As long as shopkeepers check the anti-counterfeit measures, then the lack of serial numbers is not a problem.

"If members of the public are concerned, then they should take the notes back to the bank where they will be exchanged."

The F series £5 note was never issued.

Moving to polymer 
In April 2013, the Governor of the Bank of England Sir Mervyn King announced on behalf of the bank that Elizabeth Fry would be replaced by Winston Churchill on the next £5 note which would enter circulation in 2016. It was also announced that the images featured on the reverse would include the famous 1941 portrait of Churchill (The Roaring Lion) by Yousuf Karsh, a view of the Houses of Parliament, a quote by Churchill ("I have nothing to offer but blood, toil, tears and sweat") and a background image of Churchill's Nobel Prize in Literature, while the obverse would feature an image of Queen Elizabeth II.

In December 2013 the Bank of England announced that the next £5 note would be printed on a polymer, rather than cotton paper. The bank cited that they would be cleaner, more secure and more durable. It was also said that the new polymer notes would be more environmentally friendly, lasting 2.5 times as long as cotton paper notes, according to the Bank's own environmental testing.

The note was introduced on 13 September 2016, with an initial print run of 440 million notes (worth £2.2 billion), over the period of co-circulation. It was announced that there would be a co-circulatory period with the old series E notes, and then on 5 May 2017, the series E would cease to be legal tender. However, as with all Bank of England notes, they can be exchanged at face value at any time in the future.

Ingredients controversy 
In November 2016 there was controversy when the Bank of England confirmed that the new notes contain traces of tallow in the new notes. According to an online petition on this issue, this is unacceptable to vegans, vegetarians, Muslims, Hindus, Sikhs, Jains, Jews and other groups in the UK, and one Cambridge cafe boycotted the new note. The note's manufacturer, Innovia Security, was looking into changing the recipe for the polymer used, so as to contain no animal products, which are added to polymer pellets at an early stage of production. However, on 10 August 2017 the Bank of England announced that all future notes, including future £5 note prints would continue the use of traces of tallow.

Design

List of historical designs 

Sources from the Bank of England:

Current designs 
The series G (polymer) note is the only £5 note that is currently legal tender. The old paper series E was withdrawn, following a co-circulation period with both notes being legal tender which ended on 5 May 2017.

Circulation 
The Bank of England is responsible for printing and issuing notes to ensure a smooth monetary supply across the United Kingdom. It reports the number of notes in circulation at any given time. The £5 note circulation peaked in 1979 before the £50 was re-introduced.

Table sources from the Bank of England Statistics

See also 

Bank of England note issues

Notes

References

External links 
 

Banknotes of England
Five-base-unit banknotes
1793 introductions